Vymazal (feminine: Vymazalová) is a Czech surname. Notable people with the surname include: 

 František Vymazal (1841–1917), Czech philologist
 Hana Vymazalová (born 1978), Czech Egyptologist
 Lenka Vymazalová (born 1959), Czech field hockey player
 Miroslav Vymazal (1952–2002), Czech cyclist

See also
 
 

Czech-language surnames